The 1981 Galician regional election was held on Tuesday, 20 October 1981, to elect the 1st Parliament of the autonomous community of Galicia. All 71 seats in the Parliament were up for election. The election was held simultaneously with a Statute of Autonomy referendum in Andalusia.

The governing Union of the Democratic Centre (UCD), which had been expected to maintain its primacy in a region where it had obtained favourable results in the general elections of 1977 and 1979, won 27.8% and 24 seats to come in second place to Manuel Fraga's People's Alliance (AP), which won the election with 30.5% of the vote and 26 seats. The Socialists' Party of Galicia (PSdG–PSOE), while faring better that in the general elections, did not secure the expected gains, obtaining 19.6% of the vote and 16 seats. The Communist Party of Galicia (PCE–PCG) secured 1 seat after the voiding of 1,100 PSOE votes in the La Coruña constituency deprived the Socialists from a 17th seat. Of the nationalist parties, only the Galician National-Popular Bloc–Galician Socialist Party (BNPG–PSG) and Galician Left (EG) secured parliamentary representation, with 3 and 1 seat respectively.

An agreement between AP and UCD allowed Gerardo Fernández Albor to be elected as regional president, at the head of a minority cabinet with UCD's external support. The 1981 Galician election marked the beginning of the end for the UCD as a relevant political force in Spanish politics, confirming its ever more dwindling support among voters and AP's growth at its expense. The 1982 Andalusian election held seven months later would signal a further blow to UCD, accelerating the internal decomposition of the party into the next general election.

Overview

Electoral system
The Parliament of Galicia was the devolved, unicameral legislature of the autonomous community of Galicia, having legislative power in regional matters as defined by the Spanish Constitution of 1978 and the regional Statute of Autonomy, as well as the ability to vote confidence in or withdraw it from a regional president.

Transitory Provision First of the Statute established a specific electoral procedure for the first election to the Parliament of Galicia, to be supplemented by the provisions within Royal Decree-Law 20/1977, of 18 March, and its related regulations. Voting for the Parliament was on the basis of universal suffrage, which comprised all nationals over 18 years of age, registered in Galicia and in full enjoyment of their civil and political rights. The 71 members of the Parliament of Galicia were elected using the D'Hondt method and a closed list proportional representation, with an electoral threshold of three percent of valid votes—which included blank ballots—being applied in each constituency. Parties not reaching the threshold were not taken into consideration for seat distribution. Seats were allocated to constituencies, corresponding to the provinces of La Coruña, Lugo, Orense and Pontevedra, with each being allocated a fixed number of seats: 22 for La Coruña, 15 for Lugo, 15 for Orense and 19 for Pontevedra.

The use of the D'Hondt method might result in a higher effective threshold, depending on the district magnitude.

Election date
The Provisional Government of Galicia, in agreement with the Government of Spain, was required to call an election to the Parliament of Galicia within 120 days from the enactment of the Statute, with election day taking place within sixty days after the call. As a result, an election could not be held later than the 180th day from the date of enactment of the Statute of Autonomy. The Statute was published in the Official State Gazette on 28 April 1981, setting the latest possible election date for the Parliament on Sunday, 25 October 1981.

Initially, 15 or 18 October 1981 were considered as the most likely dates for the election, but members of the governing Union of the Democratic Centre (UCD) did not rule out it taking place up to one week later, with 25 October also being considered to have election day on a Sunday. On 21 August, and after deliberation by the Provisional Government and in agreement with the State Government, President José Quiroga called the election for Tuesday, 20 October 1981.

Background

Negotiations for a new statute of autonomy for Galicia had its roots in the 1936 Statute, voted in referendum and submitted to the Spanish parliament for ratification, but never enforced due to the outbreak of the Spanish Civil War. Galicia was granted a pre-autonomic regime after Francisco Franco's death in 1975 and during the Spanish transition to democracy, together with the Valencian Country, Aragon and the Canary Islands and based on the examples of Catalonia and the Basque Country. The establishment of the Regional Government of Galicia was formalized with its official approval on 18 March 1978 and the appointment of the first provisional government under UCD's Antonio Rosón in June that year. The subsequent Spanish Constitution of 1978 and the celebration in Spain of the first ordinary general election paved the way for the re-establishment of the "historical communities" of the Basque Country, Catalonia and Galicia, under the "fast-track" procedure of Article 151 of the Constitution, setting the first steps for the institutionalization of the so-called "State of the Autonomies".

Negotiations between the various parties led to the signing of the "Hostel Pacts" on 26 September 1980, and the subsequent approval of a draft Statute of Autonomy for Galicia that was to be ratified in referendum. Above 70% of those voting in the referendum held on 21 December 1980 supported the Statute, albeit under a very low turnout of 28%. The result prompted the UCD to remain alone in government, after the resignation of its only AP member and the PSOE's refusal to rejoin it—having left in November 1979 over disagreements on the Statute issue—without a profound renovation, which the UCD rejected.

Plans to hold the first regional election by the end of April or the beginning of May 1981 were cast off as a result of a delay in the approval of the regional Statute, amid accusations that UCD was holding off the text from final ratification in the Cortes Generales over the party's deteriorating situation in Galicia as a result of the referendum's outcome. The Statute was finally brought to the Congress where it passed on 17 February 1981 with 301 ayes, 3 abstentions and no negative votes, being finally ratified by the Senate on 17 March. As a result, executive procedures were initiated so as to establish the new autonomous community and hold the first Parliament election, which was finally set for 20 October 1981.

Parties and candidates
The electoral law allowed for parties and federations registered in the interior ministry, coalitions and groupings of electors to present lists of candidates. Parties and federations intending to form a coalition ahead of an election were required to inform the relevant Electoral Commission within fifteen days of the election call, whereas groupings of electors needed to secure the signature of at least one-thousandth of the electorate in the constituencies for which they sought election—with a compulsory minimum of 500 signatures—disallowing electors from signing for more than one list of candidates. A minimum of five deputies would be required for the constitution of parliamentary groups in the Parliament of Galicia.

Below is a list of the main parties and electoral alliances which contested the election:

José María David Suárez Núñez, rector of the University of Santiago de Compostela, had been initially proposed by UCD as their leading candidate replacing José Quiroga, but in an unexpected move Quiroga's supporters outnumbered Suárez Núñez's candidacy by two votes, provoking a crisis within the Galician branch of the UCD over the disputed Quiroga's candidacy. The various UCD factions reached a compromise to put off internal quarrelling to prevent giving voters an image of disunity, by maintaining Quiroga as candidate over the difficulties in finding a replacement before the deadline for presenting lists of candidates expired.

The Socialists' Party of Galicia (PSdG–PSOE) included many Galician intellectuals within their lists, while the People's Alliance (AP) chose Gerardo Fernández Albor as their leading candidate. While an electoral coalition between UCD and AP was considered, both parties discarded such a possibility. In July 1980, the Galician Socialist Party (PSG) and the constituent parties of the Galician National-Popular Bloc (BNPG), the Galician People's Union (UPG) and the Galician National-Popular Assembly (ANPG), agreed to form an alliance. The Galicianist Party (PG) had sufferent an important internal crisis in June 1981.

A total of 986 candidates from 18 political parties stood for election, with eleven candidacies running in all four provinces: the main parties UCD, PSOE, AP, BNPG–PSG, EG, PG and PCE, as well as the Galician Socialist Unity–PSOE (historical) (USG–PSOE), the Revolutionary Communist League–Communist Movement (LCR–MCG) alliance, the Spanish Ruralist Party (PRE) and the Workers' Socialist Party (PST).

Campaign
The campaign was dominated by the perception that the ruling Union of the Democratic Centre (UCD) would achieve a precarious victory, as well as on the question of turnout, as it was feared that the high abstention rates that had dominated elections and referendums in Galicia up until that time would be repeated: 39.3% in the 1977 general election, 49.8% in the 1978 constitutional referendum, 50.8% in the 1979 general election and 71.7% in the 1980 Statute referendum.

The UCD emphasized the defense of values such as personal freedom and regional culture, the modernization of key economic sectors such as fishing and agriculture, the identity of the Spanish nation and an efficient autonomy for Galicia. The party's aim was to maintain the regional hegemony that it obtained in the 1977 and 1979 by preserving the vote from conservative, small landowners. The UCD campaign was notable for keeping with a policy of inauguration of public works and the involvement of several high-ranking ministers and members, such as Prime Minister Leopoldo Calvo-Sotelo, or his predecessor Adolfo Suárez. Politically, the party failed at targeting a single rival: some members sought to minimize losses to AP whereas others advocated for discrediting the PSOE as a viable government alternative to UCD, while concurrently discarding any-post election alliance with either party.

The Spanish Socialist Workers' Party (PSOE), the main opposition party of Spain at the time, advocated for an improvement of the Statute and in presenting a renewed image of moderation ahead of incoming elections throughout the rest of the country. Party leader Felipe González campaigned throughout Galicia with the aim of consolidating the party's gains in opinion polls, while the party considered the eventuality of a UCD–PSOE post-election arrangement as "unlikely", convinced that the UCD would choose to pact with AP instead.

The right-wing People's Alliance (AP) focused on the personal appeal of its national leader, Manuel Fraga—of Galician descent—a move which received criticism from other political parties, which dubbed it as "a trap to the electorate", because Fraga was not standing as candidate in the election. AP also tried to highlight the party's alleged "Galician personality" by campaigning extensively throughout rural areas—which had remained UCD strongholds in previous elections—aiming at securing strong gains in the region at the expense of the ruling party. The party's secretary general Jorge Verstrynge went on to claim that AP was "entirely committed to the Galician election".

The various Galician nationalist parties—mainly the Galician National-Popular Bloc–Galician Socialist Party (BNPG–PSG) alliance, the Galicianist Party (PG) and Galician Left (EG)—had little prospects of posing a challenge to the main Spanish political parties as a result of internal infighting, a shortage of economic resources and a small membership. Concurrently, the Regional Government of Galicia launched a 120 million Pta-worth institutional campaign under the "Vote for yours" slogan to try to fire up turnout. The Galician Businessmen Confederation launched their own campaign by investing 110 million Pta into prompting turnout while showing their rejection of proposals from left-wing parties. Galician bishops also entered the campaign by asking to vote "for the options that, at least, will not act against some of the fundamental elements that integrate the common good from the perspective of the Christian faith".

At the end of their respective campaigns, UCD and AP denounced each other for foul playing: the UCD accused AP of using Calvo-Sotelo's image in their benefit, whereas the latter accused the former of handing out leaflets falsely claiming that Fraga was asking for voting UCD. Calls for tactical voting were also common from UCD, PSOE and AP.

Opinion polls
he tables below lists opinion polling results in reverse chronological order, showing the most recent first and using the dates when the survey fieldwork was done, as opposed to the date of publication. Where the fieldwork dates are unknown, the date of publication is given instead. The highest percentage figure in each polling survey is displayed with its background shaded in the leading party's colour. If a tie ensues, this is applied to the figures with the highest percentages. The "Lead" column on the right shows the percentage-point difference between the parties with the highest percentages in a poll.

Voting intention estimates
The table below lists weighted voting intention estimates. Refusals are generally excluded from the party vote percentages, while question wording and the treatment of "don't know" responses and those not intending to vote may vary between polling organisations. When available, seat projections determined by the polling organisations are displayed below (or in place of) the percentages in a smaller font; 36 seats were required for an absolute majority in the Parliament of Galicia.

Voting preferences
The table below lists raw, unweighted voting preferences.

Victory likelihood
The table below lists opinion polling on the perceived likelihood of victory for each party in the event of a regional election taking place.

Results

Overall

Distribution by constituency

Aftermath

Analysis
The victory of AP over UCD caught many by surprise. The then-ruling party of Spain had not been able to win in one its most favourable regions, scoring third in the most populous province of Galicia, La Coruña—taking 19.5% of the vote, behind PSOE's 24.0% and AP's 32.7%—while also narrowly failing to win in the other Atlantic province of Pontevedra. The party was able to keep its primacy in the provinces of Lugo and Orense, but it did so with much reduced majorities when compared to its results in the region at the 1979 general election. AP went on to win much of the urban vote, with UCD support mostly confined to the rural areas.

The success of AP was attributed to Fraga's personal charisma in his home region, but also on the scale of the UCD collapse, a result of a poor popular perception of the UCD's action of government at the national level—first under Adolfo Suárez, then under Leopoldo Calvo-Sotelo—its handling of economic crisis, the autonomic process—including the party's past stance on the Galician statute—and internal conflicts over the party's future and direction since its first electoral defeats in 1980—namely, in the Basque and Catalan elections and in the Andalusian referendum. However, Galicia was considered a safe UCD stronghold, and while it was expected that the party would lose ground, an electoral defeat under AP had not been foreseen. As a result, the election outcome came as a shock to the ruling party in Spain and aggravated the internal crisis between the different party families.

In the aftermath of the Galician election, Calvo-Sotelo would oust Agustín Rodríguez Sahagún as UCD national president to take the reins of the party himself, just as the government's parliamentary standing would weaken over a number of defections within the party's caucuses in the Cortes Generales: on the one hand, former justice minister Francisco Fernández Ordóñez would leave in November 1981, together with other nine Congress deputies, to establish the Democratic Action Party (PAD); on the other hand, three further deputies would defect to AP in January 1982. Going into 1982, the UCD would be trailing the PSOE in opinion polls at the national level by double digits, with a sustainable migration of voters to AP being detected by pollsters after the Galician election. In the May 1982 Andalusian election, the UCD would further collapse to third place behind both PSOE and AP, and by the time of the October 1982 general election it would become a minor political force slightly below 7% nationally, all of which would eventually lead to the party's dissolution in February 1983.

Government formation
Under Article 15 of the Statute, investiture processes to elect the president of the Regional Government of Galicia required of an absolute majority—more than half the votes cast—to be obtained in the first ballot. If unsuccessful, a new ballot would be held 24 hours later requiring only of a simple majority—more affirmative than negative votes—to succeed. If the proposed candidate was not elected, successive proposals were to be transacted under the same procedure.

After the election, AP sought an agreement with UCD and the implementation of their "natural majority" policy, under which the understanding of the right-of-centre political parties in Spain would lead to their eventual merging. UCD leaders were split on whether accepting AP's offer of forming a full coalition government, limiting themselves to granting external support to a minority AP cabinet from or not supporting AP at all over fears that such a pact would "denature" UCD's centrist appeal and push it to the right. Any government agreement between UCD or AP with the PSOE was discarded after the Socialists discarded themselves such possibility, while the post-election crisis within UCD delayed the start of formal negotiations well into November. The date of the regional Parliament's constitution was set for 19 December by the regional UCD government almost one month after the election, a move which received criticism from other political parties which considered it an improvisation, but which allowed AP enough time to organize the future government's composition.

AP and UCD formally agreed to have former UCD's regional president Antonio Rosón elected as the Parliament's new speaker, who was elected to the post with the support of 50 out of 71 votes. Both parties reached an investiture agreement to elect AP candidate Gerardo Fernández Albor, who was voted into office on 8 January 1982, and sworn in on 21 January at the helm of a minority cabinet.

The government's stability throughout its first year of tenure would remain tenuous, with UCD not pledging a stable support and forcing AP to seek it on a case-by-case basis to avoid parliamentary defeats by an uneasy UCD–PSOE collaboration. This situation would last until the 1982 general election, when UCD's collapse and subsequent dissolution as a political party in February 1983 would lead to 12 of its former deputies to sign an agreement with AP, providing the government with a stable majority in exchange for their incorporation as cabinet members.

Notes

References
Opinion poll sources

Other

Galicia
Regional elections in Galicia (Spain)
October 1981 events in Europe
1981 in Galicia (Spain)